Angelique Kerber was the defending champion, but retired in the semifinals against Sloane Stephens.

Stephens went on to win the title, defeating Elena Vesnina in the final, 7–6(7–4), 6–2, having saved a match point against Daria Kasatkina in the quarterfinals. Vesnina was the first qualifier in history to reach the final of this event.

Seeds
The top eight seeds received a bye into the second round.

Draw

Finals

Top half

Section 1

Section 2

Bottom half

Section 3

Section 4

Qualifying

Seeds

Qualifiers

Lucky losers

Draw

First qualifier

Second qualifier

Third qualifier

Fourth qualifier

Fifth qualifier

Sixth qualifier

Seventh qualifier

Eighth qualifier

References

 Main Draw
 Qualifying Draw

2016 WTA Tour
2016